The Fear of Flying Tour was the debut concert tour by American recording artist Mýa. It was Harrison's first headlining tour and launched in support of her second studio album, Fear of Flying (2000). Harrison embarked on a ten-day nationwide concert tour. The tour began March 2001 and played 9 shows in the United States.

Background
Released April 2000, Fear of Flying was Harrison's second studio effort. Upon release, Fear of Flying had received mixed reviews from music critics and initially stalled on the charts. The album's second single, "Case of the Ex" became a breakthrough chart success both stateside and worldwide and in turned solidified Fear of Flying as a hit album. A multiplatinum success, Fear of Flying subsequently earned a platinum plaque from  RIAA.  In March 2001, her record label Interscope had announced Mýa would start her own headlining tour to further support her second studio album, Fear of Flying. Prior to the tour, Harrison had served as an opening act for Montell Jordan on his European tour in Germany.

Setlist
The following setlist was obtained from the concert held on March 28, 2001, at the Royal Oak Music Theatre in Royal Oak, Michigan. It does not represent all concerts for the duration of the tour. 
"The Best of Me"
"Pussycats"
"We're Gonna Make Ya Dance"
"How You Gonna Tell Me"
"Ride & Shake"
"It's All About Me"
"Miss You Much"
"Ghetto Supastar (That Is What You Are)" / "Free"
"Can't Believe"
"My First Night with You"
Encore
"Movin' On"
"Case of the Ex"

Shows

References

2001 concert tours